Jameh Mosque of Gorgan is one of the monuments of Gorgan. This mosque is located next to the Bazaar Nalbandan. The mosque is built in the Seljuq dynasty and has spherical minaret on which are the Kufic line.

Sources 

Mosques in Iran
Mosque buildings with domes
National works of Iran
Gorgan